"Magazine" is a single by British indie rock band, Editors. The song is the lead single off of their sixth studio album, Violence. The single was released on 16 January 2018 through PIAS Recordings.

Background 
The band revealed that the song was originally written around 2010 and 2011 in between the In This Light and on This Evening and The Weight of Your Love sessions.

Style 
Ben Kaye, writing for Consequence of Sound described the album as a clash between electronic dance music, dark wave and rock, calling it a more upbeat track on the album.

The song has been described by the band as "a pointed finger aimed at those in power… some corrupt politician or businessman… a character, and a tongue in cheek poke at the empty posturing and playing to the masses of the power hungry."

Music video 
The music video was directed by Rahi Rezvani, who also directed the band's music videos from the previous album, In Dream.

Charts

References

External links
 

2018 songs
2018 singles
Editors (band) songs
PIAS Recordings singles
Music videos directed by Rahi Rezvani
Songs written by Edward Lay
Songs written by Russell Leetch
Songs written by Tom Smith (musician)
Songs written by Justin Lockey
Songs written by Elliott Williams